TaunusTurm (originally Kaiserkarree) is the project name for a complex of two buildings, a  skyscraper and a  high-rise residential building, in Frankfurt, Germany. The site is located in Frankfurt's financial district, the Bankenviertel, at the corner of Neue Mainzer Straße and Taunustor. The site borders a park named Taunusanlage, which gave the tower its name (the Taunus is a low mountain range north of Frankfurt). The buildings were designed by architecture firm Gruber + Kleine-Kraneburg. The project developer is real estate building and operating company Tishman Speyer which also built the Messeturm and the Opernturm in Frankfurt. The start of construction was in April 2011 and the first tenants moved in February 2014.

History
In 1998 the City of Frankfurt approved a new high-rise development plan which specifies where new skyscrapers are allowed to be built in the city. One of the approved locations was the estate owned by Commerzbank and Rheinhyp at Taunustor, right at the heart of Frankfurt's financial district. In 2000 architecture firm Gruber + Kleine-Kraneburg won an architecture competition for the planned tower, but the project slowed down after the Dot-com bubble burst in 2000 and the September 11 attacks in 2001. Meanwhile the Rheinhyp became part of real estate bank Eurohypo and moved to Eschborn, therefore Commerzbank took over responsibility for the property.

In 2007 Commerzbank announced that it wanted to sell the property because there was no need to use it for own purposes. At the end of the same year Tishman Speyer and Commerz Real bought the property and said that they would build the tower unchanged from the previous design. It was agreed upon with the City of Frankfurt that a part of the tower would be used for apartments. The demolition of the existing buildings on the property was scheduled to start in spring 2008 but was delayed because Tishman Speyer surprisingly announced that the plans for the tower had changed: Instead of one broad tower they changed the design to two towers, one  and one , and therefore a clear parting between office use and residential use.

Tishman Speyer submitted a building application in 2010 and started the demolition process but shortly after the demolition was once again stopped because the main tenant for the office tower (rumoured to be Clifford Chance) cancelled the contract negotiations. Tishman Speyer then announced that the towers, now called Taunusturm, would not be built in the near future.

The construction of the towers began in April 2011 and finished in time to open in February 2014.

Gallery

Skyscrapers in Frankfurt

See also 
List of tallest buildings in Frankfurt
List of tallest buildings in Germany
List of tallest buildings in the European Union

References

External links 

TaunusTurm – Official Website
Gruber + Kleine-Kraneburg – Official Website
Tishman Speyer – Official Website
www.emporis.com/Kaiserkarree "Kaiserkarree" (old design)

Skyscrapers in Frankfurt
Buildings and structures completed in 2014
2014 establishments in Germany
Skyscraper office buildings in Germany
Residential skyscrapers in Germany